The State Theatre is a historic theatre in Minneapolis, Minnesota, USA. It is one of four restored theatres in the Hennepin Theatre District.

The State Theatre seats 2,181. It opened in 1921 and was then considered the most technologically advanced and elaborate theatre in the United States. It was designed by the Chicago architect J.E.O. Pridmore in a free Italian Renaissance style and boasted the first well-driven air conditioning system in Minneapolis. The original stage floor was glass, lit from underneath to create stunning visual effects. The opening night program included a silent film, newsreel and travelogue. A Wurlitzer pipe organ was installed in 1925 and concerts were held every day for 25 cents. The State's original neon marquee, which ran the entire width of the theatre, dated back to its opening; it was replaced with electric bulbs and large letters reading "STATE" in the 1940s. The neon sign was recreated for a modern remodel and again adorns the theatre's frontage. Between 1921 and 1978, the State Theatre was used primarily as a movie house, but also hosted vaudeville acts, concerts and ballet. The movie screen was the largest screen west of the Mississippi River at the time. Butch Cassidy and the Sundance Kid set a national record at the State in 1970 for the longest run in America. The final picture show was Tommy on New Year's Eve 1975.

The theatre was built on the site of the first mansion constructed by T. B. Walker in 1874 for his family at 803 Hennepin Avenue. His home stood there for forty years until it was demolished to make way for the theatre complex.

From 1978 to 1989, the building was the Jesus People Church. The historic exterior State Theater signage was removed and church signage was installed. Interior alterations were also made.

The Minneapolis Community Development Agency purchased the LaSalle Plaza block, including the State, in 1989 as part of the LaSalle Plaza development. After nearly two years of renovation at a cost of $8.8 million, the State Theatre re-opened in November 1991 with the Minnesota Opera's production of Carousel. The six chandeliers in the house are original, as are the murals on the walls. Since the re-opening in 1991, the State has hosted live Broadway touring productions such as Avenue Q, Sweeney Todd and Joseph and the Amazing Technicolor Dreamcoat, concerts by Patti Smith and Gordon Lightfoot, author and adventure speaker series and films including the world premiere of the Minnesota-based movie, Grumpy Old Men. The theater appeared in the film Jingle All the Way with Arnold Schwarzenegger and Sinbad in 1996. Hennepin Theatre Trust has been the owner and operator since 2005.

Historic Theatre Group's original partner was Jujamcyn Productions. SFX (now Live Nation) bought Jujamcyn Productions in 2000. Live Nation sold most of its theatrical properties, including its Minneapolis operations, to Key Brand Entertainment in 2008.

References

Theatres in Minnesota
Buildings and structures in Minneapolis
Tourist attractions in Minneapolis